Sihle Njezula (born 23 June 1998) is a South African rugby union player for the  in the Currie Cup and . His regular position is wing.

Njezula was named in the  squad for the 2021 Currie Cup Premier Division. He made his debut for Western Province in Round 1 of the 2021 Currie Cup Premier Division against , scoring a try.

References

South African rugby union players
1998 births
Living people
Rugby union wings
Stormers players
Western Province (rugby union) players
Pumas (Currie Cup) players